Japan has the highest proportion of elderly citizens of any country in the world. 2014 estimates showed that about 38% of the Japanese population was above the age of 60, and 25.9% were above the age of 65, a figure that increased to 29.1% by 2022. People aged 65 and older in Japan make up a quarter of the total population and are estimated to reach a third of the population by 2050.

The aging of Japanese society, characterized by sub-replacement fertility rates and high life expectancy, is expected to continue. Japan had a post-war baby boom between 1947 and 1949, followed by a prolonged period of low fertility. These trends resulted in the decline of Japan's population beginning in 2011. In 2014, Japan's population was estimated to be 127 million. This figure is expected to shrink to 107 million (16%) by 2040 and to 97 million (24%) by 2050 if this current demographic trend continues. A recent global analysis found that Japan was one of 23 countries that could see a total population decline of 50% or more by 2100. These trends have led some researchers to claim that Japan is transforming into a "super-ageing" society in both rural and urban areas. 
 
Japanese citizens largely view Japan as comfortable and modern, with no widespread sense of a "population crisis." The Japanese government has responded to concerns about the stresses demographic changes place on the economy and social services with policies intended to restore the fertility rate as well as making the elderly more active in society.

Aging dynamics 

The number of Japanese people 65 years or older nearly quadrupled over a period of 40 years to 33 million in 2014, accounting for 26% of Japan's population. In the same period, the number of children aged 14 and younger decreased from 24.3% of the population in 1975 to 12.8% in 2014. The number of elderly people surpassed the number of children in 1997, and sales of adult diapers surpassed diapers for babies in 2014. This change in the demographic makeup of Japanese society, referred to as population aging, has taken place in a shorter period of time than in any other country.

According to population projections based on the current fertility rate, individuals over the age of 65 will account for 40% of the population by 2060, and the total population will fall by one-third from 128 million in 2010 to 87 million by 2060. Economists at Tohoku University established a countdown to national extinction, which projects that Japan will have only one remaining child in 4205. These predictions prompted a pledge by Prime Minister Shinzō Abe to set a threshold for population decline at 100 million.

Causes

The aging of the Japanese population is a result of one of the world's lowest fertility rates combined with a high life expectancy.

High life expectancy
Japan's life expectancy was 85 years in 2016, 81.7 years for males and 88.5 years for females. As Japan's overall population shrinks due to low fertility rates, the proportion of the elderly increases.

Life expectancy at birth increased rapidly from the end of World War II, when the average was 54 years for women and 50 for men, and the percentage of the population aged 65 years and older has increased steadily since the 1950s. The increase in life expectancy translated into a depressed mortality rate until the 1980s, but mortality has increased again to 10.1 per 1000 people in 2013 — the highest since 1950.

Factors such as improved nutrition, advanced medical and pharmacological technologies, and improved living conditions have all contributed to the longer-than-average life expectancy. Moreover, peace and prosperity following World War II were integral to the massive economic growth of post-war Japan, which also contributed to the population's longevity. The proportion of health care spending has also dramatically increased as Japan's older population spends more time in hospitals and visiting physicians. On any given day in 2011, 2.9% of people aged 75–79 were in a hospital, and 13.4% were visiting a physician.

Low fertility rate

Japan's total fertility rate (or TFR, the number of children born from each woman in her lifetime) has remained below the replacement threshold of 2.1 since 1974, and reached a historic low of 1.26 in 2005. Experts believe that signs of a slight recovery reflect the expiration of a "tempo effect," as fertility rates accommodate a major shift in the timing and number of children, rather than any positive change. As of 2016, the TFR was 1.41 children born per woman.

Economy and culture

A range of economic and cultural factors contributed to the decline in childbirth during the late 20th century: later and fewer marriages, higher education, urbanization, increase in nuclear family households (rather than the extended family), poor work-life balance, increased participation of women in the workforce, a decline in wages and lifetime employment, small living spaces and the high cost of raising a child.

Many young people face economic insecurity due to a lack of regular employment. About 40% of Japan's labor force is non-regular, including part-time and temporary workers. Non-regular employees earn about 53 percent less than regular ones on a comparable monthly basis, according to the Labor Ministry. Young men in this group are less likely to consider marriage or to be married. Many young Japanese people also report that fatigue from overwork hinders their motivation to pursue romantic relationships.

Although most married couples have two or more children, a growing number of young people postpone or entirely reject marriage and parenthood. Conservative gender roles often mean that women are expected to stay home with the children rather than work. Between 1980 and 2010, the percentage of the population who had never married increased from 22% to almost 30%, even as the population continued to age, and by 2035 one in four men will not marry during their prime parenthood years. The Japanese sociologist Masahiro Yamada coined the term  for unmarried women in their late 20s and 30s who continue to live with their parents. 

Government survey results released on 14 June 2022 showed 1 in 4 singles in their 30s have no desire to marry. Reasons are loss of freedom, financial burden and housework. In 2021 marriages declined to 514,000. There's a diversification of families such as common-law relationships, unmarried and divorced. Only  46.4% of men and women in their 30s hope to marry, while 26.5% of men and 25.4% of women prefer to remain single. Among the never before married: more women said they do not want to shoulder the burden of housework, childcare and nursing care. More men said financial and job instability were prime reasons to shun marriage. More women than men don't want to change their surname.

Virginity and abstinence rates

In 2015, 1 in 10 Japanese adults in their 30s reported having had no heterosexual sexual experiences. Even when researchers made estimations to account for people who report no heterosexual intercourse but may have had same-sex intercourse, around 5 percent of people, or one in 20, aged 30 to 39 years old, would still lack sexual experience. The percentage of 18 to 39-year-old women without sexual experience was 24.6% in 2015, an increase from 21.7% in 1992. Likewise, the percentage of 18 to 39-year-old men without sexual experience was 25.8% in 2015, an increase from 20% in 1992. Men with stable jobs and a high income were found to be more likely to have sex, while low-income men were 10 to 20 times more likely to have had no sex experience. Conversely, women with lower income were more likely to have had intercourse. Men who were unemployed are eight times more likely to be virgins, and men who are part-time or temporary employed had a four times higher virginity rate. This indicates that money and social status are important for men in dating.

According to a 2010 survey, 61% of single Japanese men in their 20s, and 70% of single Japanese men in their 30s call themselves "herbivore men" (sōshoku danshi), meaning that they are not interested in getting married or having a girlfriend.

A 2022 survey by the Japanese Cabinet Office found that circa 40% of unmarried Japanese men in their 20s have never been on a single date. By comparison, 25% of young adult women said they never dated. 5% of married men and women had zero dating partners and probably used konkatsu (short for kekkon katsudo, or marriage hunting, a series of strategies and events similar to finding employment) to find a spouse.

Effects

Demographic trends are altering relations within and across generations, creating new government responsibilities and changing many aspects of Japanese social life. The aging and decline of the working-age population has triggered concerns about the future of the nation's workforce, potential economic growth, and the solvency of the national pension and healthcare services.

Social
A smaller population could make the country's crowded metropolitan areas more livable, and the stagnation of economic output might still benefit a shrinking workforce. However, the low birth rate and high life expectancy has also inverted the standard population pyramid, forcing a narrowing base of young people to provide and care for a bulging older cohort even as they try to form families of their own. In 2014, the aged dependency ratio (the ratio of people over 65 to those age 15–65, indicating the ratio of the dependent elderly population to those of working age) was 40%, meaning two aged dependents for every five workers. This is expected to increase to 60% by 2036 and to nearly 80% by 2060.

In 2015, 177,600 people between the ages of 15 and 29 were caring directly for an older family member. However, the migration of young people into Japan's major cities, the entrance of women into the workforce, and the increasing cost of care for both young and old dependents have required new solutions, including nursing homes, adult daycare centers, and home health programs. Every year Japan closes 400 primary and secondary schools, converting some of them to care centers for the elderly.

There are special nursing homes in Japan that offer service and assistance to more than 30 residents. In 2008, it was recorded that there were approximately 6,000 special nursing homes available that cared for 420,000 Japanese elders. With many nursing homes in Japan, the demand for more caregivers is high. In Japan, family caregivers are preferred as the main caregiver because it is a better support system if an elderly person is related to his/her caregiver. Therefore, it is possible that Japanese elderly people can perform activities of daily living (ADLs) with little assistance and live longer if his/her caregiver is a family caregiver.

The disposable income in Japan's older population has increased business in biomedical technologies research in cosmetics and regenerative medicine.

Political
The Greater Tokyo Area is virtually the only locality in Japan to see population growth, mostly due to internal migration from other parts of the country. Between 2005 and 2010, 36 of Japan's 47 prefectures shrank by as much as 5%, and many rural and suburban areas are struggling with an epidemic of abandoned homes (8 million across Japan). Masuda Hiroya, a former Minister for Internal Affairs and Communications who heads the private think tank Japan Policy Council, estimated that about half the municipalities in Japan could disappear between now and 2040 as young people, especially young women, move from rural areas into Tokyo, Osaka, and Nagoya, where around half of Japan's population is already concentrated. The government is establishing a regional revitalization task force and focusing on developing regional hub cities, especially Sapporo, Sendai, Hiroshima and Fukuoka.

Internal migration and population decline have created a severe regional imbalance in electoral power, where the weight of a single vote depends on where it was cast. Some depopulated districts send three times as many representatives per voter to the National Diet as their growing urban counterparts. In 2014, the Supreme Court of Japan declared the disparities in voting power violate the Constitution, but the ruling Liberal Democratic Party, which relies on rural and older voters, has been slow to make the necessary realignment.

The increasing proportion of elderly people has a major impact on government spending and policies. As recently as the early-1970s, the cost of public pensions, health care, and welfare services for the aged amounted to only about 6% of Japan's national income. In 1992 that portion of the national budget was 18%, and it is expected that by 2025 28% of national income will be spent on social welfare. Because the incidence of chronic disease increases with age, the health care and pension systems are expected to come under severe strain. In the mid-1980s, the government began to re-evaluate the relative burdens of government and the private sector in health care and pensions, and it established policies to control government costs in these programs.

The large share of elderly inflation-averse voters may also hinder the political attractiveness of pursuing higher inflation, consistent with the evidence that aging may lead to lower inflation. With the increasing older population and decreasing young population, 38% percent of the population will be people aged 65 and older by 2065. This concludes that Japan has the highest amount of public debt in the world because of the low fertility rates and aging population. Japan's government has spent almost half of its tax revenue trying to recover from their debt. According to IMF, Japan has a 246.14 debt percentage of GDP, making it the highest public debt.

Economic

From the 1980s on there was an increase of older-age workers and a shortage of young workers in Japan's workforce, from employment practices to benefits to the participation of women. The U.S. Census Bureau estimated in 2002 that Japan would experience an 18% decrease of young workers in its workforce and an 8% decrease in its consumer population by 2030. The Japanese labor market is already under pressure to meet demands for workers, with 125 jobs for every 100 job seekers at the end of 2015, as older generations retire and younger generations become smaller in quantity.

Japan made a radical change in how its healthcare system is regulated by introducing long-term care insurance in 2000. The proportion of old Japanese citizens will soon level off; however, there is a decline in the young population due to zero growth, death exceeding the births. For example, the number of young people under the age of 19 in Japan will constitute only 13 percent in the year 2060, which used to be 40 percent in 1960.

The decline in the working population is impacting the national economy. It is causing a shrinkage of the nation's military. The government has focused on medical technologies such as regenerative medicines and cell therapy to recruit and retain more of the older population into the workforce. A range of small and medium-sized enterprises (SMEs) have also pioneered new practices for retaining workers beyond mandated retirement ages, such as through workplace improvements to create working environments better suited to older workers as well as new job tasks specifically for older workers.

Mounting labor shortages in the 1980s and 90s led many Japanese companies to increase the mandatory retirement age from 55 to 60 or 65, and today many allow their employees to continue working after official retirement. The growing number of retirement age people has put a strain on the national pension system. In 1986, the government increased the age at which pension benefits begin from 60 to 65, and shortfalls in the pension system have encouraged many people of retirement age to remain in the workforce and have driven some others into poverty.

The retirement age may go even higher in the future if Japan continues to have older age populations in its overall population. A study by the UN Population Division released in 2000 found that Japan would need to raise its retirement age to 77 (or allow net immigration of 17 million by 2050) to maintain its worker-to-retiree ratio. Consistent immigration into Japan may prevent further population decline; therefore, it is encouraged that Japan develops policies that will support a large influx of young immigrants.

Less desirable industries, such as agriculture and construction, are more threatened than others. The average farmer in Japan is 70 years old, and while about a third of construction workers are 55 or older, including many who expect to retire within the next ten years, only one in ten are younger than 30.

The decline in working-aged cohorts may lead to a shrinking economy if productivity does not increase faster than the rate of Japan's decreasing workforce. The OECD estimates that similar labor shortages in Austria, Germany, Greece, Italy, Spain, and Sweden will depress the European Union's economic growth by 0.4 percentage points annually from 2000 to 2025, after which shortages will cost the EU 0.9 percentage points in growth. In Japan, labor shortages will lower growth by 0.7 percentage points annually until 2025, after which Japan will also experience a 0.9 percentage points loss in growth.

Places with high birthrates
These are places in Japan with significantly higher birth rates than the national average:

Nagareyama
The city Nagareyama in Chiba Prefecture is 30 kilometers from Tokyo. In the early 2000s, Nagareyama experienced an exodus of young people, due to lack of childcare facilities. In 2003, mayor Yoshiharu Izaki made investments in childcare centers a primary focus of the city's government spending. It included a transit service at Nagareyama-centralpark Station where parents can drop off their children on their way to work. Here the children are shuttled by buses to day care centers, driven by local seniors. There is also a summer camp for children while their parents work during holidays. These and other family-friendly approaches (such as local events and community spaces where children and elderly interact) lured young working parents from Tokyo to Nagareyama. As a result the city's population grew over 20% between 2006 and 2019, with many parents listing childcare as one of the main reasons to move to Nagareyama. 85% of families in the city have more than one child, and young children are expected to outnumber the elderly in the near future.

Matsudo and Akashi
Matsudo city in Chiba has had a population increase of 3.1% since 2015. It said to be due to day care centers near or inside train stations without waiting lists and four co-working spaces with childcare rooms. The population of Akashi in Hyōgo grew 3.6%. This is attributed to a childcare facility with a large indoor playground near the local JR train station since 2017. There's also a "diaper subscription" where support staff deliver necessities for infants for free.

West Japan

Western Japan (Kyushu, Chūgoku region, and Shikoku) has a higher birth rate than Central and Eastern Japan. The 15 prefectures with a TFR of 1.45 or higher are all located in the Kyushu, Chugoku regions or Shiloku, except for Fukui Prefecture and Siga Prefecture. Prefectures with a low TFR are concentrated in eastern or northern Japan. Central Japan is average.

Okinawa Prefecture
Okinawa prefecture has had the highest birth rate in Japan for over 40 years since recording began in 1899. Okinawa was the only prefecture with a natural population increase in 2018. The fertility rate was 1.89 while Tokyo had the lowest of 1.20, and the national average in 2018 was 1.42. There were 15,732 births and 12,157 deaths, according to the Ministry of Health, Labour and Welfare. The average age of marriage is lower in Okinawa, at 30 years for men and 28.8 years for women. The national average is 31.1 years for men and 29.4 years for women.

Anthropologist Dr. Thang Leng Leng (National University of Singapore) said families tend to have more than two children because of "Okinawa's sense of social norms, in terms of 'this is how things should be.'" It is considered normal to marry and then have children. This is despite Okinawa having less welfare for children compared to other regions in Japan. It's not unusual for women in their 40s to have children. 1 in 20 babies born at the Nanbu Tokushukai Hospital is conceived via IVF. Living in Okinawa is considered less stressful due to lower living costs. Raising a child is less expensive, and fewer students attend university in Okinawa. Dr. Thang said people in Okinawa are more relaxed with a tropical culture and not so punctual as the rest of Japan. The work ethic in Okinawa is more laid back. Prime Minister Shinzo Abe's workplace policies enable returning mothers to work more flexible and leave work earlier. There's less competition in the workplace due to fewer high-paying large corporations compared to Osaka and Tokyo. Pediatrician, Chuken Miyagi said there's a culture of mutual help and support called . Grandparents and relatives live relatively close to help family members and mothers with raising their children. There's a high sense of closeness among the people of Okinawa because society is largely rural. In big cities like Tokyo, people frequently rent houses and live there temporarily which hampers the development of close bonds with the neighborhood and local people. The ratio of mothers to fathers at the Jinen Pediatric Clinic in Okinawa is 7 to 3 compared to 10 to 0 in mainland Japan (2018).

Government policies

The Japanese government is addressing demographic problems by developing policies to encourage fertility and retain more of its population, especially women and the elderly, in the workforce. Incentives for family formation include expanded opportunities for childcare, new benefits for those who have children and a state-sponsored dating service. However, "Womenomics," the set of policies intended to bring more women into the workplace as part of Prime Minister Shinzō Abe's economic recovery plan, has struggled to overcome cultural barriers and entrenched stereotypes.

These policies could prove useful for bringing women back into the workforce after having children, but they can also encourage the women who opt not to have children to join the workforce. The Japanese government has introduced other policies to address the growing elderly population as well, especially in rural areas. Many young people end up moving to the city in search of work, leaving behind a growing elderly population and a smaller workforce to take care of them. Because of this, Japan's national government has tried to improve welfare services such as long-term care facilities and other services that can help families at homes, such as daycare or in-home nursing assistance. The Gold Plan was introduced in 1990 to improve these services and attempted to reduce the burden of care placed on families, followed by long-term care insurance (LTCI) in 2000. These plans have been upgraded and revised over the years to provide more local welfare services and institutions in rural areas, yet the rapidly increasing elderly population makes these efforts difficult to maintain.

Immigration 

A net decline in population due to a historically low birth rate has raised the issue of immigration as a way to compensate for labor shortages. While public opinion polls tend to show low support for immigration, most people support an expansion in working-age migrants on a temporary basis to maintain Japan's economic status. Comparative reviews show that Japanese attitudes are broadly neutral and place Japanese acceptance of migrants in the middle of developed countries.

The number of immigrants would have to increase by eight percent in order for Japan's economy to be stable. Japan's government is first trying to increase tourism rates, which boosts their economy and brings in foreign workers. The government has also recruited international students, which allow foreigners to begin work and potentially stay in Japan to help the economy while existing initiatives such as the JET Program encourage English-speaking people from across the world to work in Japan as English language teachers. However, Japan is strict when accepting refugees into their country. Only 27 people out of 7,500 refugee applicants were granted into Japan in 2015. However, Japan provides high levels of foreign and humanitarian aid. In 2016, there was a 44% increase in asylum seekers to Japan from Indonesia, Nepal, and the Philippines. Since Japan does not generally permit low-skilled workers to enter, many people went through the asylum route instead. This allowed immigrants to apply for asylum and begin work six months after the application. However, it did not allow foreigners without valid visas to apply for work.

Work-life balance 

Japan has focused its policies on work-life balance with the goal of improving the conditions for an increase in birth rate. To address these challenges, Japan has established goals to define the ideal work-life balance that would provide the environment for couples to have more children with the passing of the Child Care and Family Care Leave Law, which took effect in June 2010.

The law provides both mothers and fathers with an opportunity to take up to one year of leave after the birth of a child (with the possibility to extend the leave for another six months if the child is not accepted to enter nursery school) and allows employees with preschool-age children the following allowances: up to five days of leave in the event of a child's injury or sickness, limits on the amount of overtime in excess of 24 hours per month based on an employee's request, limits on working late at night based on an employee's request, and opportunity for shorter working hours and flex time for employees.

The goals of the law would strive to achieve the following results in 10 years are categorized by the female employment rate (an increase from 65% to 72%), percentage of employees working 60 hours or more per week (decrease from 11% to 6%), rate of use of annual paid leave (an increase from 47% to 100%), rate of child care leave (an increase from 72% to 80% for females and .6% to 10% for men), and hours spent by men on child care and housework in households with a child under six years of age (an increase from 1 hour to 2.5 hours a day).

Comparisons with other countries

Japan's population is aging faster than any other country on the planet. The population of those 65 years or older roughly doubled in 24 years, from 7.1% of the population in 1970 to 14.1% in 1994. The same increase took 61 years in Italy, 85 years in Sweden, and 115 years in France. Life expectancy for women in Japan is 87 years, five years more than that of the U.S. Men in Japan with a life expectancy of 81 years, have surpassed U.S. life expectancy by four years. Japan also has more centenarians than any other country (58,820 in 2014, or 42.76 per 100,000 people). Almost one in five of the world's centenarians live in Japan, and 87% of them are women.

In contrast to Japan, a more open immigration policy has allowed Australia, Canada, and the United States to grow their workforce despite low fertility rates. An expansion of immigration is often rejected as a solution to population decline by Japan's political leaders and people. Reasons include fear of foreign crime, and a desire to preserve cultural traditions.Historically, European countries have had the largest elderly populations by proportion as they became developed nations earlier and experienced the subsequent drop in fertility rates, but many Asian and Latin American countries are quickly catching up.  As of 2015, 22 of the 25 oldest countries are located in Europe, but Japan is currently the oldest country in the world, and its rapidly aging population displays a trend that other parts of Asia such as South Korea, Hong Kong, and Taiwan are expected to follow by 2050.  As recently developed nations continue to experience improved health care and lower fertility rates, the growth of the elderly population will continue to rise. In 1970–1975, only 19 countries had a fertility rate that can be considered below-replacement fertility and there were no countries with exceedingly low fertility (<1.3 children); however, between 2000 and 2005, there were 65 countries with below-replacement fertility, and 17 with exceedingly low fertility.

While there has been a global trend of lower fertility and longer life expectancy, it is first evident in the more developed countries and occurs more rapidly in developing or recently developed countries.  One of the most astounding aspects of Japan's elderly population, in particular, is that it is both fast-growing and has one of the highest life expectancies, equating to a larger elderly population and an older one. According to the World Health Organization, Japanese people are able to live 75 years without any disabilities and fully healthy compared to other countries. Also, American women usually live to around 81 years and American men 76; but compared to Japan, women live to around 87 years and men to 80 years. There is demographic data that shows Japan is an older and more quickly aging society than the United States. 

Japan is leading the world in aging demographics, but the other countries of East Asia are following a similar trend. In South Korea, where the fertility rate is the world's lowest (0.81 as of 2022), the population is expected to peak in 2030. The smaller states of Singapore and Taiwan are also struggling to boost fertility rates from record lows and to manage aging populations. China's fertility rate is lower than Japan's and is aging faster than almost all other countries in modern history. More than a third of the world's elderly (65 and older) live in East Asia and the Pacific, and many of the economic concerns raised first in Japan can be projected to the rest of the region. India's population is aging exactly like that of Japan, but with a 50-year lag. A study of the populations of India and Japan for the years 1950 to 2015 combined with median variant population estimates for the years 2016 to 2100 shows that India is 50 years behind Japan on the aging process.

See also
Children's Day (Japan)
Demographics of Japan
Elderly people in Japan
Marriage in Japan
Respect for the Aged Day

General:
List of countries and dependencies by population
List of countries and dependencies by population density
Generational accounting
Sub-replacement fertility

International:
Aging of Europe
Aging of the United States
Russian Cross

Notes

References

External links
Japanese Statistics Bureau Statistical Yearbook
Another Tsunami Warning: Caring for Japan's Elderly, (NBR Expert Brief, April 2011)

Old age in Japan
Demographics of Japan
Japan